George Ivory (born August 7, 1965) is the head men's basketball coach for Mississippi Valley State University. He was the head men's basketball coach at the University of Arkansas-Pine Bluff from 2008 to 2021.  Previously, Ivory was an assistant at Mississippi Valley State, his alma mater, from 1998–2002, 2007–2008, and 2021–2022.

Playing career
Ivory grew up in Jackson, Mississippi, where he attended Murrah High School, one of the top basketball schools in the country. He played at Murrah for three years, winning numerous awards prior to graduating in 1983. 
 
After Ivory finished at Murrah High School, he went on to attend college at Mississippi Valley State University. While at MVSU Ivory was selected as Freshman of the Year, First Team All-SWAC, SWAC Tournament MVP, and Player of the Year in the conference. Ivory started all four years at Mississippi Valley State University, where he still ranks tops in scoring, steals, assist, minutes, and games played. 
 
Upon graduating from Mississippi Valley State University in 1988 with a bachelor's degree, and after trying out professionally with the Chicago Bulls, Harlem Globetrotters, and Illinois Express, Ivory was drafted by the Wyoming Wildcatters of the CBA.

Coaching career 
Ivory later went back to college at Jackson State University to receive his master's degree in 1996 while working as a graduate assistant with the Lady Tigers for three years before becoming a full-time assistant in 1991–1998 under head coach Andrew Pennington. 
 
JSU won two tournament championships, a regular-season championship, and made one NCAA appearance. In the fall of 1998, Ivory accepted a similar position with Mississippi Valley State University as men's assistant coach under then-head coach Lafayette Stribling, where they had several outstanding recruiting classes as well as several outstanding teams which competed for SWAC titles for consecutive years. 
 
Ivory subsequently crossed the state line to become an assistant coach at UAPB in the fall of 2002 under then-head coach Van Holt. Holt and staff led the Golden Lions to the finals of the SWAC Tournament in 2005–06. 
 
In 2006–07, Ivory crossed another state line as he was hired as an assistant coach at Grambling State University under then-head coach Larry Wright. In 2007–08 Ivory went back to his alma mater Mississippi Valley State University as an assistant coach under then-head coach James Green, where they went on to win the SWAC Tournament Championship and advanced to the first round of the NCAA Tournament.

Arkansas–Pine Bluff 
In the spring of 2008, Ivory was named the head coach of Arkansas-Pine Bluff. Prior to the start of his first season, the Golden Lions were picked 9th in the SWAC's preseason poll, but UAPB went on to finish in 4th place in the SWAC during their 2008-09 campaign. Arkansas-Pine Bluff also completed conference play with a winning record for the first time in school history. 
 
The 2009–10 basketball season brought about unprecedented success for the University of Arkansas-Pine Bluff men's basketball team. After starting the year 0-11, the Golden Lions finished the season with a remarkable run all the way to the NCAA tournament. The Golden Lions went 18-5 over the course of their last 23 games as they concluded the season with an 18-16 overall record.
UAPB won the 2010 SWAC Basketball Tournament Championship, marking the schools’ first title in over four decades (1967). Arkansas-Pine Bluff followed their undefeated SWAC tourney run with a victory over the Winthrop Eagles in the NCAA Opening Round game, snapping a 17-year conference losing streak in the NCAA tournament.

The Golden Lions eventually faced the NCAA National Champion Duke University basketball team in the first round of the tournament. Arkansas-Pine Bluff was the only Division I institution from the state of Arkansas to qualify for the NCAA tournament. For his teams outstanding accomplishments on the court Ivory was named the 2010 HSRN National Coach of the Year, becoming the first coach from Arkansas-Pine Bluff to be awarded such honors. On April 6, 2021, Ivory resigned from UAPB after 13 seasons at the helm.

Mississippi Valley State
On March 14, 2022, Ivory was named the 12th head coach at his alma mater, Mississippi Valley State, replacing Lindsey Hunter.

Head coaching record

References

1965 births
Living people
American men's basketball coaches
American men's basketball players
Arkansas–Pine Bluff Golden Lions men's basketball coaches
Basketball coaches from Mississippi
Basketball players from Mississippi
Mississippi Valley State Delta Devils basketball coaches
Mississippi Valley State Delta Devils basketball players